Ultimae Records is a Lyon-based record label founded by Aes Dana and Sandrine Gryson in 1999. They release and distribute various forms of ambient and trance music.

List of Ultimae Records artists
List of recording artists who currently or formerly recorded for Ultimae Records:

References

External links
 Official site
 

French record labels
Electronic music record labels
Trance record labels